The 2006 Latvian Figure Skating Championships were the national championships of the 2005–06 figure skating season. Skaters competed in the disciplines of men's singles and ladies' singles.

Senior results

Men

Ladies

External links
 results

Latvian Figure Skating Championships, 2006